Nagercoil Sudalaimuthu Krishnan, popularly known as Kalaivanar and also as NSK, was an Indian actor-comedian, theatre artist, playback singer and writer in the early stages of the Tamil film industry – in the 1940s and 1950s. He is considered as the "Charlie Chaplin of India."

List

As actor

As director 
 Panam (1952)  – Dialogues by M Karunanidhi
 Manamagal (1951) – Dialogues by M Karunanidhi
 Pelli Koothuru (1951)

References

External links

Indian filmographies
Male actor filmographies